The British Academy Video Games Award for Music is an award presented annually by the British Academy of Film and Television Arts (BAFTA). It is given to recognize "excellence in composition for a game music score, through original music and/or creative use of licensed track". The award is given to the composers/development team, the developer and the publisher of the winning game.

The award was first presented at the 1st British Academy Games Awards under the name Original Music. From the 3rd edition to the 7th, the category was named Original Score. It returned to its original name from the 8th to the 10th editions. Since the 11th edition it is presented under its current name. Santa Monica Studio and Sony Interactive Entertainment are the most awarded developer and publisher, with two and seven wins respectively. Among developers, Ubisoft Montreal holds the record for most nominations and most nominations without a win, with seven, while Xbox Game Studios is the most nominated publisher without a win, with nine. No composer has won the BAFTA more than once, and six composers are tied for most nominations, with four. Among those six, Jesper Kyd and Lorne Balfe are the only composers without a win.

The current holders of the award are Bobby Krlic, Joe Thwaites and Harry Krueger, composers of Returnal by Housemarque and Sony Interactive Entertainment, which won at the 18th British Academy Games Awards in 2022.

Winners and nominees
In the following table, the years are listed as per BAFTA convention, and generally correspond to the year of game release in the United Kingdom.

 Note: The games that don't have composers on the table had Development Team credited on the awards page.

Multiple nominations and wins

Composers

Developers

Publishers

See also
 Grammy Award for Best Score Soundtrack for Video Games and Other Interactive Media

References

External links
 Official website

Music